The following species in the genus Potentilla are recognised by The Plant List:

Potentilla acaulis L.
Potentilla achillea (Soják) Soják
Potentilla acuminata H.M.Hall
Potentilla adenotricha Vodop.
Potentilla adriatica Murb.
Potentilla adscharica Sommier & Levier
Potentilla agrimonioides M.Bieb.
Potentilla alba L.
Potentilla alchemilloides Lapeyr.
Potentilla algida Soják
Potentilla alpicola De la Soie
Potentilla anachoretica Soják
Potentilla anatolica Peșmen
Potentilla ancistrifolia Bunge
Potentilla anglica Laichard.
Potentilla angustiloba T.T.Yu & C.L.Li
Potentilla anserina L.
Potentilla apennina Ten.
Potentilla approximata Bunge
Potentilla arcadiensis Iatroú
Potentilla arctica Rouy
Potentilla arenosa (Turcz.) Juz.
Potentilla argaea Boiss. & Balansa
Potentilla argentea L.
Potentilla argenteiformis Kauffm.
Potentilla arguta Pursh
Potentilla argyrophylla Wall. ex Lehm.
Potentilla arnavatensis (Th.Wolf) Th.Wolf ex Juz.
Potentilla articulata Franch.
Potentilla aspegrenii Kurtto
Potentilla asperrima Turcz.
Potentilla assalemica Soják
Potentilla assimilis Soják
Potentilla asterotricha Soják
Potentilla astracanica Jacq.
Potentilla astragalifolia Bunge
Potentilla asturica Rothm.
Potentilla atrosanguinea G.Lodd. ex D.Don
Potentilla aucheriana Th.Wolf ex Bornm.
Potentilla × aurantiaca Soják
Potentilla aurea L.
Potentilla bactriana Soják
Potentilla balansae Peșmen
Potentilla × beckii Murr
Potentilla beringii Jurtzev
Potentilla betonicifolia Poir.
Potentilla biennis Greene
Potentilla biflora Willd. ex Schltdl.
Potentilla bipinnatifida Douglas ex Hook.
Potentilla borissii Ovcz. & Kochk.
Potentilla bornmuelleri Borbás
Potentilla botschantzeviana Adylov
Potentilla brachypetala Fisch. & C.A.Mey. ex Lehm.
Potentilla brauniana Hoppe
Potentilla brevifolia Nutt. ex Torr. & A.Gray
Potentilla bungei Boiss.
Potentilla butkovii Botsch.
Potentilla calabra Ten.
Potentilla calycina Boiss. & Balansa
Potentilla camillae Kolak.
Potentilla canadensis L.
Potentilla cardotiana Hand.-Mazz.
Potentilla carniolica A.Kern.
Potentilla caulescens L.
Potentilla centigrana Maxim.
Potentilla × chalchorum Soják
Potentilla chamissonis Hultén
Potentilla chinensis Ser.
Potentilla chrysantha (Zoll. & Moritzi) Trevir.
Potentilla cinerea Chaix ex Vill.
Potentilla clusiana Jacq.
Potentilla × collina Wibel
Potentilla concinna Richardson
Potentilla conferta Bunge
Potentilla coriandrifolia G.Don
Potentilla crantzii (Crantz) Beck ex Fritsch
Potentilla crassinervia Viv.
Potentilla crenulata T.T.Yu & C.L.Li
Potentilla crinita A.Gray
Potentilla cryptophila Bornm.
Potentilla cryptotaeniae Maxim.
Potentilla czerepninii Krasnob.
Potentilla darvazica Juz.
Potentilla delavayi Franch.
Potentilla delphinensis Gren.
Potentilla deorum Boiss. & Heldr.
Potentilla desertorum Bunge
Potentilla detommasii Ten.
Potentilla discolor Bunge
Potentilla divina Albov
Potentilla doerfleri Wettst.
Potentilla doubjonneana Cambess.
Potentilla drummondii Lehm.
Potentilla elatior Willd. ex Schltdl.
Potentilla elegans Cham. & Schltdl.
Potentilla emilii-popii Nyár.
Potentilla erecta (L.) Raeusch.
Potentilla eriocarpa Wall. ex Lehm.
Potentilla eversmanniana Fisch. ex Claus
Potentilla evestita Th.Wolf
Potentilla exuta Soják
Potentilla fallens Cardot
Potentilla fedtschenkoana Siegfr. ex Th.Wolf
Potentilla ferganensis Soják
Potentilla fissa Nutt. ex Torr. & A.Gray
Potentilla flabellata Regel & Schmalh.
Potentilla flabellifolia Hook. ex Torr. & A.Gray
Potentilla flagellaris Willd. ex Schltdl.
Potentilla fragarioides L.
Potentilla fragiformis Willd. ex Schltdl.
Potentilla freyniana Bornm.
Potentilla frigida Vill.
Potentilla geranioides Willd.
Potentilla glabra G.Lodd.
Potentilla glabrata Willd. ex Schltdl.
Potentilla glaucescens Willd. ex Schltdl.
Potentilla gombalana Hand.-Mazz.
Potentilla gordiaginii Juz.
Potentilla gracilis Douglas ex Hook.
Potentilla gracillima Kamelin
Potentilla grammopetala Moretti
Potentilla grandiflora L.
Potentilla granulosa T.T.Yu & C.L.Li
Potentilla griffithii Hook.f.
Potentilla grisea Juz.
Potentilla haynaldiana Janka
Potentilla heptaphylla L.
Potentilla heynii Roth
Potentilla hippiana Lehm.
Potentilla hirta L.
Potentilla hispanica Zimmeter
Potentilla hookeriana Lehm.
Potentilla humifusa Willd. ex Schltdl.
Potentilla hyparctica Malte
Potentilla hypargyrea Hand.-Mazz.
Potentilla hypoleuca Turcz.
Potentilla imbricata Kar. & Kir.
Potentilla imerethica Gagnidze & Sokhadze
Potentilla incana P.Gaertn., B.Mey. & Scherb.
Potentilla inclinata Vill.
Potentilla × insularis Soják
Potentilla intermedia L.
Potentilla × italica Lehm.
Potentilla jenissejensis Polozhij & W.A.Smirnova
Potentilla johanniniana Goiran
Potentilla karatavica Juz.
Potentilla kemulariae Kapeller & Kuth.
Potentilla kionaea Halácsy
Potentilla kleiniana Wight & Arn.
Potentilla kotschyana Fenzl
Potentilla kryloviana Th.Wolf
Potentilla kulabensis Th.Wolf
Potentilla kuznetzowii (Govor.) Juz.
Potentilla lancinata Cardot
Potentilla lazica Boiss. & Balansa ex Boiss.
Potentilla leuconota D.Don
Potentilla leucopolitana P.J.Müll.
Potentilla libanotica Boiss. & Spruner
Potentilla limprichtii J.Krause
Potentilla lindackeri Tausch
Potentilla lineata Trevir.
Potentilla lomakinii Grossh.
Potentilla longifolia Willd. ex Schltdl.
Potentilla longipes Ledeb.
Potentilla macropoda Soják
Potentilla macrosepala Cardot
Potentilla matsumurae Th.Wolf
Potentilla matsuokana Makino
Potentilla megalantha Takeda
Potentilla megalocarpus Popov
Potentilla meyeri Boiss.
Potentilla micrantha Ramond ex DC.
Potentilla microphylla D.Don
Potentilla millefolia Rydb.
Potentilla × mixta Nolte ex Rchb.
Potentilla miyabei Makino
Potentilla mollissima Lehm.
Potentilla montana Brot.
Potentilla montenegrina Pant.
Potentilla morefieldii Ertter
Potentilla mujensis Kurbatski
Potentilla multicaulis Bunge
Potentilla multiceps T.T.Yu & C.L.Li
Potentilla multifida L.
Potentilla multisecta (S.Watson) Rydb.
Potentilla neglecta Baumg.
Potentilla nepalensis Hook.
Potentilla nervosa Juz.
Potentilla neumanniana Rchb.
Potentilla nevadensis Boiss.
Potentilla newberryi A.Gray
Potentilla nicicii Adamović
Potentilla nitida L.
Potentilla nivalis Lapeyr.
Potentilla nivea L.
Potentilla nordmanniana Ledeb.
Potentilla norvegica L.
Potentilla nurensis Boiss. & Hausskn. ex Boiss.
Potentilla oblanceolata Rydb.
Potentilla × okensis Petunn.
Potentilla omeiensis (T.T.Yu & C.L.Li) Soják
Potentilla omissa Soják
Potentilla ovina Macoun
Potentilla oweriniana Rupr. ex Boiss.
Potentilla ozjorensis Peschkova
Potentilla pamirica Th.Wolf
Potentilla pamiroalaica Juz.
Potentilla pannosa Boiss. & Hausskn. ex Boiss.
Potentilla parvifolia Fisch. ex Lehm.
Potentilla patula Waldst. & Kit.
Potentilla pectinisecta Rydb.
Potentilla pedata Willd. ex Hornem.
Potentilla peduncularis D.Don
Potentilla pendula T.T.Yu & C.L.Li
Potentilla penniphylla Soják
Potentilla pensylvanica L.
Potentilla pimpinelloides L.
Potentilla pindicola Hausskn.
Potentilla plattensis Nutt.
Potentilla plumosa T.T.Yu & C.L.Li
Potentilla polyphylla Wall. ex Lehm.
Potentilla porphyrantha Juz.
Potentilla potaninii Th.Wolf
Potentilla praecox F.W.Schultz
Potentilla pseudosericea Rydb.
Potentilla pulchella R.Br.
Potentilla pulcherrima Lehm.
Potentilla pulviniformis A.P.Khokhr.
Potentilla pusilla Host
Potentilla pyrenaica Ramond ex DC.
Potentilla ranunculoides Kunth
Potentilla recta L.
Potentilla reptans L.
Potentilla reuteri Boiss.
Potentilla rhenana P.J.Müll. ex Zimmeter
Potentilla rigida Wall. ex Lehm.
Potentilla rigidula Th.Wolf
Potentilla rigoana Th.Wolf
Potentilla rimicola (Munz & I.M.Johnst.) Ertter
Potentilla rivalis Nutt. ex Torr. & A.Gray
Potentilla robbinsiana (Lehm.) Oakes ex Rydb.
Potentilla rosulifera H.Lév.
Potentilla × rubella T.J.Sørensen
Potentilla rubida L.O.Williams
Potentilla rubricaulis Lehm.
Potentilla rupifraga A.P.Khokhr.
Potentilla rupincola Osterh.
Potentilla ruprechtii Boiss.
Potentilla sajanensis Polozhij
Potentilla sanguisorba Willd. ex Schltdl.
Potentilla saposhnikovii Kurbatski
Potentilla saundersiana Royle
Potentilla savvalensis Pawl>l.
Potentilla saxifraga Ardoino ex De Not.
Potentilla × schrenkiana Regel
Potentilla schugnanica Juz. ex Adylov
Potentilla seidlitziana Bien.
Potentilla × sergievskajae Peschkova
Potentilla sericea L.
Potentilla silesiaca R.Uechtr.
Potentilla simplex Michx.
Potentilla simulatrix Th.Wolf
Potentilla sischanensis Bunge ex Lehm.
Potentilla smithiana Hand.-Mazz.
Potentilla sommerfeltii Lehm.
Potentilla sommieri Siegfr. & R.Keller
Potentilla sosnowskyi Kapeller
Potentilla speciosa Willd.
Potentilla sphenophylla Th.Wolf
Potentilla stenophylla (Franch.) Diels
Potentilla sterilis (L.) Garcke
Potentilla stipularis L.
Potentilla stolonifera Lehm. ex Ledeb.
Potentilla straussii (Bornm.) Bornm.
Potentilla suavis Soják
Potentilla subdigitata T.T.Yu & C.L.Li
Potentilla × suberecta Zimmeter
Potentilla subjuga Rydb.
Potentilla sublaevis O.Schwarz
Potentilla subvahliana Jurtzev
Potentilla subviscosa Greene
Potentilla supina L.
Potentilla svanetica Siegfr. & R.Keller
Potentilla szovitsii Th.Wolf
Potentilla tabernaemontani Asch.
Potentilla tanacetifolia Willd. ex Schltdl.
Potentilla taronensis Wu ex T.T.Yu & C.L.Li
Potentilla taurica Willd. ex Schltdl.
Potentilla tenuis (Hand.-Mazz.) Soják
Potentilla tephroleuca Th.Wolf
Potentilla tephroserica Juz.
Potentilla tericholica Sobolevsk.
Potentilla thurberi A.Gray
Potentilla thuringiaca Bernh.
Potentilla thyrsiflora Hülsen ex Zimmeter
Potentilla tianschanica Th.Wolf
Potentilla × tikhomirovii Jurtzev
Potentilla tobolensis Th.Wolf ex Pavlov
Potentilla tommasiniana F.W.Schultz
Potentilla transcaspia Th.Wolf
Potentilla tridentula Velen.
Potentilla tschimganica Soják
Potentilla × tschukotica Jurtzev ex V.V.Petrovsky
Potentilla tucumanensis <small>A.Castagnaro & M.Arias]] bis</small>Potentilla tugitakensis Masam.Potentilla turczaninowiana Stschegl.Potentilla turfosa Hand.-Mazz.Potentilla turgaica SojákPotentilla umbrosa Steven ex M.Bieb.Potentilla uniflora Ledeb.Potentilla vahliana Lehm.Potentilla valderia L.Potentilla verticillaris Stephan ex Willd.Potentilla villosa Pall. ex PurshPotentilla × villosula JurtzevPotentilla virgata Lehm.Potentilla visianii PančićPotentilla volgarica Juz.Potentilla vorobievii Nechaeva & SojákPotentilla vulcanicola Juz.Potentilla vvedenskyi Botsch.Potentilla wimanniana Günther & SchummelPotentilla wismariensis T.Gregor & HenkerPotentilla wrangelliana Fisch. & Avé-Lall.Potentilla xizangensis T.T.Yu & C.L.Li

ITIS list
The following additional species are accepted by ITIS, although they might be considered synonyms by other sources:Potentilla albiflora L.O. Williams – white-flower cinquefoil, Pinaleno cinquefoil, whiteflower cinquefoilPotentilla ambigens Greene – silkyleaf cinquefoilPotentilla angelliae N.H. Holmgren – Boulder Mountain cinquefoil, Angell cinquefoilPotentilla arizonica Greene – Garland Prairie cinquefoilPotentilla basaltica Tiehm & Ertter – Soldier Meadow cinquefoilPotentilla bicrenata Rydb.Potentilla bimundorum Soják – staghorn cinquefoilPotentilla breweri S. WatsonPotentilla bruceae Rydb. – Bruce's cinquefoilPotentilla buccoana ClementiPotentilla cottamii N.H. Holmgren – Pilot Range cinquefoil, Cottam's cinquefoilPotentilla crebridens Juz.Potentilla cristae Ferlatte & Strother – crested cinquefoilPotentilla demotica Ertter – Hualapai cinquefoilPotentilla diversifolia Lehm. (pro sp.) – varileaf cinquefoilPotentilla effusa Douglas ex Lehm. – branched cinquefoilPotentilla furcata A.E. Porsild – forked cinquefoilPotentilla glaucophylla Lehm.Potentilla grayi S. Watson – Gray's cinquefoilPotentilla hickmanii Eastw. – Hickman's cinquefoil, Hickman's potentillaPotentilla holmgrenii D.F. Murray & Elven – Holmgren's cinquefoilPotentilla jepsonii ErtterPotentilla johnstonii Soják – sagebrush cinquefoilPotentilla lasiodonta Rydb. – Sandhills cinquefoilPotentilla litoralis Rydb. – Pennsylvania cinquefoilPotentilla macounii Rydb. – Macoun's cinquefoilPotentilla modesta Rydb. – Uintah cinquefoilPotentilla multijuga Lehm. – Ballona cinquefoilPotentilla nana Willd. ex Schltdl. – arctic cinquefoilPotentilla × nubilans SojákPotentilla paucijuga Rydb. – La Sal cinquefoilPotentilla pedersenii (Rydb.) Rydb.Potentilla puberula KrasanPotentilla rhyolitica ErtterPotentilla rupestris L.Potentilla sanguinea Rydb. – scarlet cinquefoilPotentilla saximontana Rydb.Potentilla sierrae-blancae Wooton & Rydb. – Sierra Blanca cinquefoilPotentilla subgorodkovii JurtzevPotentilla townsendii Rydb. – Townsend's cinquefoilPotentilla × tundricola SojákPotentilla uschakovii JurtzevPotentilla verna L. – spring cinquefoilPotentilla versicolor Rydb. – Steens Mountain cinquefoilPotentilla wheeleri S. Watson – Kern cinquefoil

GRIN list
The following additional species are accepted by the Germplasm Resources Information Network (GRIN), although they might be considered synonyms by other sources, or be erroneous accessions:Potentilla curvisetaPotentilla dickinsiiPotentilla dombeyiPotentilla gelidaPotentilla hebiichigoPotentilla hemsleyanaPotentilla indicaPotentilla ledebourianaPotentilla nudicaulisPotentilla paradoxaPotentilla ranunculusPotentilla rubicaulisPotentilla siemersianaPotentilla sundaicaPotentilla togasiiPotentilla tridentataOthersPotentilla sterneri'' is newly described

References

Potentilla